Alfred Bendixen is a lecturer in the department of English at Princeton University  and the founder and Executive Director of the American Literature Association.

Bendixen gained a Ph.D. at the University of North Carolina in 1979, with a thesis on "Americans in Europe before 1865 : a study of the travel book". He held posts at Barnard College (1979-1988) and California State University, Los Angeles (1988-2005) before moving to Texas A&M University, where he served as the Associate Department Head of English (2007-2009) and a Professor of English (2006 - 2013). He now serves as a Lecturer in English at Princeton University.

His research has centered on the recovery of 19th century literature and neglected genres, including the ghost story, detective fiction, science fiction, and travel writing.

Selected publications
Haunted women : the best supernatural tales by American women writers (1985, F. Ungar)
Edith Wharton: New Critical Essays (1992, Garland, with Annette Zilversmit)
The Whole Family, new edition and introduction to this 12-author 1908 novel (2001, Duke UP)
The Cambridge Companion to American Travel Writing (2009, Cambridge UP, with Judith Hamera)
A Companion to the American Short Story (2010, Wiley-Blackwell, with James Nagel) 
A Companion to the American Novel (2012,Wiley-Blackwell)
The Cambridge History of American Poetry (2014, Cambridge UP, co-edited with Stephen Burt)

References

External links

Year of birth missing (living people)
Living people
Texas A&M University faculty
University of North Carolina alumni
Barnard College faculty
California State University, Los Angeles faculty
Place of birth missing (living people)